Benjamin Ruggles (February 21, 1783September 2, 1857) was a National Republican and Whig politician from Ohio. He served in the U.S. Senate.

Biography
Born in Abington, Connecticut, Ruggles studied law and was admitted to the bar. Ruggles moved to Marietta, Ohio to practice law in 1807, then moved to St. Clairsville, Ohio in 1810.

Career
After serving as a judge in the Ohio state courts from 1810 to 1815, Ruggles was elected to the Senate, serving three terms from 1815-1833. He did not run for re-election in 1832. Ohio Presidential elector in 1836 for Whig William Henry Harrison.

Family life
Ruggles married in Connecticut in 1812. His first wife died in St. Clairsville in 1817, and he remarried in 1825.

Death
Ruggles died on September 2, 1857 and was buried in Saint Clairsville Union Cemetery.

Notes

References

External links
Benjamin Ruggles entry at The Political Graveyard

1783 births
1857 deaths
People from Pomfret, Connecticut
American people of English descent
Democratic-Republican Party United States senators from Ohio
National Republican Party United States senators from Ohio
Ohio Democratic-Republicans
Ohio National Republicans
Ohio Whigs
1836 United States presidential electors
Ohio state court judges
People from St. Clairsville, Ohio
Politicians from Marietta, Ohio
Ohio lawyers
19th-century American judges
19th-century American lawyers